The Department of Environment, Land, Water and Planning (DELWP) was a government department in Victoria, Australia.

Commencing operation in January 2015, the DELWP was created in the aftermath of the 2014 state election, with Premier Daniel Andrews announcing that the previous Department of Environment and Primary Industries (DEPI) would be renamed. The newly formed DELWP subsequently assumed property and land titles, planning and local government portfolios from the previous Department of Transport, Planning and Local Infrastructure, whilst responsibilities for agriculture were transferred to the Department of Economic Development, Jobs, Transport and Resources.

The department was responsible for various matters related to the environment, energy and planning. On 1 January 2023, planning functions were transferred to the Department of Transport and Planning and DELWP was renamed to Department of Energy, Environment and Climate Action.

Functions
The DELWP had responsibility for the following policy areas:
 Environment
 Energy
 Wildlife
 Heritage
 Climate change
 Waste and resource recovery
 Planning
 Marine and coasts
 Planning
 Property and land titles
 Water and catchments
 Forest Fire Management Victoria (an agency for Bush firefighting)

References

External links 
Department of Environment, Land, Water and Planning

Environment of Victoria (Australia)
Environment
Government agencies established in 2015
2015 establishments in Australia
Victoria